Albert Leese was a professional rugby league footballer who played in the 1920s and 1930s. He played at club level for Castleford (Heritage No.).

Playing career

County League appearances
Albert Leese played in Castleford's victory in the Yorkshire County League during the 1932–33 season.

References

External links
Search for "Leese" at rugbyleagueproject.org
Albert Leese Memory Box Search at archive.castigersheritage.com

Castleford Tigers players
English rugby league players
Place of birth missing
Place of death missing
Year of birth missing
Year of death missing